Bethany Louise Mooney (born 14 January 1994) is an Australian professional cricketer who plays for the national cricket team as a batter in all three formats of the game. At the domestic level, she plays as a wicket-keeper-batter for Western Australia and Perth Scorchers. In March 2020, at the conclusion of the ICC Women's T20 World Cup 2020, she became the world's number one batter in Women's Twenty20 International (WT20I) cricket.

Early life and career
Mooney was born in Shepparton, Victoria. She has a brother, Tom, and a sister, Gabrielle. As a child, she played many sports, ranging from soccer to tennis and Australian rules football. Shortly before her eighth birthday, she was invited to fill-in for her brother's cricket team; that invitation turned into her making regular appearances for Kialla Lakes Cricket Club.

When Mooney was 10 years old, she and her family moved to Hervey Bay, Queensland, where she attended Star of the Sea Catholic Primary School and Xavier Catholic College. Early in the mornings before school in Hervey Bay, she and her father would go riding their bikes along the Esplanade, and sea kayaking with their dog.

Mooney did not start playing cricket in Queensland until a year after her move. At that year's Hervey Bay Zone trials, she was identified as the best catcher in her team, and was advised by the team's coach to try wicket-keeping. She was then selected as a wicket-keeper for the Queensland Primary School girls team, and later progressed through higher level junior Queensland girls teams. Meanwhile, she played for Hervey Bay's boys' Cavaliers team until she was 18 years old, as there were no girls cricket teams in rural areas.

By the time she was about 13, Mooney was already being tipped to play cricket for Australia. She also made really good friends in cricket, and that kept her in the game, as did her enjoyment of travelling to Brisbane and national competitions, and missing school for a few days to play. Additionally, she felt that interstate girls cricket was a step up from the men's cricket she was playing in Hervey Bay.

Upon leaving school, Mooney started a teaching degree. However, she quit her studies in 2014 to focus on cricket, after realising that she would have only one chance to make it in the game.

Domestic and franchise career

Mooney made her debut for the Queensland Fire in the Women's National Cricket League four days after her 16th birthday in 2010.  Currently, she plays as a wicket-keeper/batter for Western Australia and Perth Scorchers.

In November 2018, Mooney was named in Brisbane Heat's squad for the 2018–19 Women's Big Bash League season (WBBL|04). During the final of the WBBL|04 tournament, held on a sweltering Australia Day 2019, she overcame a dizziness-inducing illness to score a player of the match-winning 65 runs from 46 balls. (However, the opposition wicket-keeper Alyssa Healy appeared to sledge Mooney during her innings, saying on the player mic, "It's actually not that hot out here") Her innings inspired the Heat to its maiden Women's Big Bash title, with a three-wicket victory over the heavily favoured Sydney Sixers.

On 21 November 2020, Mooney became the first player to score 3000 runs in the Women's Big Bash League competition. In April 2022, she was bought by the London Spirit for the 2022 season of The Hundred in England.

WPL 
In the inaugural season of the Indian Women's Premier League in 2023, Beth Mooney was bought by Gujarat Giants (GG) at the price of 2 crore rupees.

International career
Mooney was a member of the victorious Southern Stars squad that won the 2014 ICC World Twenty20 title in Bangladesh. Mooney played her first game for the Australia women's national cricket team in a Twenty20 match against India on 26 January 2016 at the Adelaide Oval. On 26 February 2017, she scored her maiden Women's One Day International (WODI) hundred against New Zealand.

She made her Test debut for Australia Women against England Women on 9 November 2017 in the Women's Ashes.

In December 2017, she won both the inaugural ICC T20I Player of the Year and Emerging Player of the Year awards. In April 2018, she was one of the fourteen players to be awarded a national contract for the 2018–19 season by Cricket Australia. In October 2018, she was named in Australia's squad for the 2018 ICC Women's World Twenty20 tournament in the West Indies.

In April 2019, Cricket Australia awarded her with a contract ahead of the 2019–20 season. In June 2019, Cricket Australia named her in Australia's team for their tour to England to contest the Women's Ashes.

In January 2020, she was named in Australia's squad for the 2020 ICC Women's T20 World Cup in Australia. In Australia's match against Bangladesh, Mooney and Alyssa Healy combined for an opening partnership of 151 runs, the highest partnership for Australia Women for any wicket in a WT20I match. In the final, Mooney top-scored for Australia, finishing unbeaten on 78 off 54 balls to help Australia win their fifth title. Mooney also finished as the tournament's leading runs scorer with 259 runs, including the most fours (30), and was named player of the tournament.

In February 2021, Mooney voiced her ambition to eventually succeed Alyssa Healy as the national team's first choice wicket-keeper.

On 15 April 2021, Mooney was named as the Wisden Leading Woman Cricketer in the World for her performances the previous year. On the same day, it was announced that she had retained her Australian central contract. In January 2022, Mooney was named in Australia's squad for their series against England to contest the Women's Ashes. Later the same month, she was named in Australia's team for the 2022 Women's Cricket World Cup in New Zealand. In May 2022, Mooney was named in Australia's team for the cricket tournament at the 2022 Commonwealth Games in Birmingham, England.

Playing style
Interviewers have described Mooney as "flying under the radar", something she prefers to do. However, she admitted in June 2020 that in light of her recent success on the field, keeping a low profile was going to be more difficult. She also said that "... it's all good if I can’t!"

International centuries

One Day International centuries

T20 International centuries

References

External links

 
 
 Beth Mooney at Cricket Australia

1994 births
Living people
Cricketers from Victoria (Australia)
Sportswomen from Victoria (Australia)
Australia women Test cricketers
Australia women One Day International cricketers
Australia women Twenty20 International cricketers
Brisbane Heat (WBBL) cricketers
Northern Districts women cricketers
Queensland Fire cricketers
Yorkshire Diamonds cricketers
Yorkshire women cricketers
Perth Scorchers (WBBL) cricketers
IPL Trailblazers cricketers
Gujarat Giants (WPL) cricketers
Wisden Leading Woman Cricketers in the World
Wicket-keepers
Cricketers at the 2022 Commonwealth Games
Commonwealth Games gold medallists for Australia
Commonwealth Games medallists in cricket
London Spirit cricketers
Western Australia women cricketers
Australian expatriate sportspeople in England
Medallists at the 2022 Commonwealth Games